Congregation Yetev Lev D'Satmar is a large Hasidic synagogue located at Kent Avenue and Hooper Street in Williamsburg, Brooklyn. Its building was constructed in 2006 by followers of Aaron Teitelbaum, as a result of a feud with followers of Zalman Teitelbaum (both sons of the deceased Satmar rebbe Moshe Teitelbaum). It has been dubbed the "miracle synagogue" because it was constructed in just 14 business days.

Background
In 1984, Satmar Rebbe Moshe Teitelbaum placed his oldest son, Aaron, in charge of the Satmar community in Kiryas Joel, New York, but in 1999, he appointed his third son, Zalman, as his successor. Since then, the two sons and their respective followers have been feuding over who is the rightful successor of Moshe, with the followers of Aaron attempting to gain control of approximately $372 million (today $ million) worth of Satmar buildings and land (including its synagogues) in Williamsburg, and elsewhere.

Following his death in April 2006, Moshe's will supported Zalman, as did a Satmar rabbinical court, though supporters of Aaron dispute the validity of both. After a New York state court ruled in July that the dispute was outside of its jurisdiction, followers of Aaron, who, in previous years, had been excluded from main Satmar institutions—including the main Satmar synagogue on Rodney Street—and celebrated the High Holy Days in a large tent, started plans to build an alternative main synagogue.

Construction
In 2006, the synagogue was built in 14 days by a team of over 200 workers, including 125 employees and 80 volunteers. Workers worked 18-hour days, in order to have the building ready in time for the Jewish New Year, pausing only on the Sabbath.

As a result of the rapid pace of construction, a number of the city's Department of Buildings rules were violated, including "working without a sidewalk shed" and "straying from approved plans". The department did not take action after two reports of unsafe working conditions, but issued a stop-work order after a worker fell about 20 feet from a metal structure on September 15. Nevertheless, work continued; according to the New York Sun, Jennifer Givner, a department spokesperson "could not rule out the possibility that the department had given the go-ahead to resume work", and the congregation denied that it broke any rules.

Building

The 13,000 or 18,000 square foot steel frame structure has cinder block walls, and is covered in stucco. The interior was not fully finished in time for the New Year, and it was planned that the concrete floors would be covered with wood and the walls with marble in time for the Simchat Torah holiday three weeks later. The structure seats between 2,300 and 4,350, and has a total capacity of 7,000 people.

The building was named after Aaron's great-great-grandfather, Rabbi Yekusiel Yehuda Teitelbaum, known as "The Yetev Lev", after the name of a book of Torah commentary he published. Zalman's supporters derisively referred to the synagogue as "the Home Depot shul".

Subsequent events
In 2016, Rabbi Isaac (or Isack) Rosenberg—synagogue president, and one of the driving forces behind (and financial backers of) the construction of the synagogue—died, after being caught in a rip tide off the coast of Florida. The funeral took place on Hooper Street, in front of the synagogue, which was filled with nearly 1000 mourners.

Notes

External links
Congregation Yetev Lev D'Satmar of Kiryas Joel Inc. v. Congregation Yetev Lev D'Satmar Inc., New York Law Journal, February 9, 2006.
Matter of Congregation Yetev Lev D'Satmar, Inc. v Kahana, Appellate Division, Second Department, 2006 NYSlipOp 05627, New York State Law Reporting Bureau, July 11, 2006.
"Synagogue bandit stole $400 from donation box: cops", New York Post, July 27, 2018.

2006 establishments in New York City
Hasidic Judaism in New York City
Hasidic synagogues
Orthodox synagogues in New York City
Jewish organizations established in 2006
Satmar (Hasidic dynasty)
Synagogues completed in 2006
Synagogues in Brooklyn
Williamsburg, Brooklyn
Yiddish culture in New York City